The Triple Crown of Cycling is a term used in road bicycle racing to denote the achievement of winning three major titles in the same season, usually the Giro d'Italia general classification, the Tour de France general classification and the UCI Road World Championships Road Race.

It is considered by many fans of the sport to be the greatest 'single' achievement in cycling. Although mostly it means winning the Giro, the Tour and the Road World Championships in one calendar year, occasionally a broader definition is also seen where the victory in the Giro d'Italia can be exchanged for the Vuelta a España; this alternative has gained traction as the Vuelta, historically the least prestigious Grand Tour, has gained in reputation and importance. A hat-trick which did not include the Tour de France and the World title would not generally be considered as the Triple Crown.

So far, the triple crown of cycling (in both the narrower and the broader definition) has been achieved by only three cyclists, Eddy Merckx, Stephen Roche and Annemiek van Vleuten. Requiring a cyclist who is excellent as both a general classification rider, and a classics racer, it is considered the hardest achievement in professional road bicycle racing in the same year.

Despite the prestige of the achievement, the Triple Crown of cycling is not an official title, and there is no physical award given for its accomplishment.

Triple crowns won
The Triple Crown has only been achieved twice by men (both times by winning Giro/Tour/Worlds):

Women's Triple crowns won

Near wins
Some cyclists have been close to winning the triple crown of cycling, winning two of the three requirements.
Among those who came close are Eddy Merckx on other occasions, the Italian great Fausto Coppi, Frenchman Bernard Hinault, and later Spaniard Miguel Indurain, who finished sixth and second in the World Championships after completing the Giro-Tour Double in 1992 and 1993 respectively.

Winning two grand tours in one year
Coppi was the first rider in the history of the sport to win the Giro d'Italia and the Tour de France in the same year which he did twice in 1949 and 1952. At the World road race championships in 1949 Coppi came third behind Rik Van Steenbergen of Belgium and Ferdi Kübler of Switzerland.  Merckx was the first rider to win the triple crown but he had already come close to winning it in 1972 when he won both the Tour and the Giro, coming fourth in the World road race. After his disappointment, Merckx broke the world hour record several weeks later.

Ireland's Stephen Roche won the Giro and Tour in 1987. Later that year, with victory at the World road race championship in Villach in Austria, Roche became only the second to win the Triple Crown of Cycling.

Indurain won the Giro-Tour double in both 1992 and 1993 and in both years he was very active in the World Road Race. In 1992 he finished sixth but in 1993 Indurain was very close to winning the Triple crown when he finished second behind Lance Armstrong.

Winning one grand tour and world championship in one year
Hinault was aiming for winning the triple crown during the 1980 season. That year he won the 1980 Giro d'Italia before going on to the 1980 Tour de France. However, during the Tour, Hinault suffered from knee injury and despite winning three stages, he left the race while leading the general classification. Several weeks later he became world champion in Salanches.
In the table below are the results in other grand tours of cyclists who won the world championship and a grand tour in one year. DNF (did not finish) indicates that the cyclist started the race, but did not finish; DNE (did not enter) indicates that the cyclist did not enter the race.

Other definitions

Career Triple Crown
Only eight riders have won the equivalent of a career Triple Crown, meaning two different grand tours and a Gold in the world championship road race. In addition to Merckx, Roche and Van Vleuten who won the triple crown in a single season they are Fausto Coppi, Jan Janssen, Felice Gimondi, Bernard Hinault and Joop Zoetemelk.

Riders who have won at least two gold medals and three grand tours include Eddy Merckx (WC x 3, TdF x 5, Giro x 5, Vuelta x 1), Greg LeMond (WC x 2, TdF x 3), Alfredo Binda (WC x 3, Giro x 5), Annemiek van Vleuten (WC x 2, TdF x 1, Giro x 3), Marianne Vos (WC x 3, Giro x 3), and Anna Van der Breggen (WC x 2, Giro x 4).

Winning all three grand tours in a career

No rider has ever won all three grand tours in a single calendar year although Chris Froome and Jacques Anquetil won all three grand tours in just over nine months spanning two calendar years.

Winning all three grand tours (Tour de France, Giro d'Italia and Vuelta a España ) in a career is sometimes called a  grand tour career triple crown, although more usually it would be described as a career grand slam.

Only seven riders have achieved this feat, and only one, Eddy Merckx has achieved both a classic Triple Crown and a career clean sweep of Grand Tour titles (He also achieved a career clean sweep of Monument classics, the 5 most prestigious one-day classic races).

Only Bernard Hinault and Alberto Contador have achieved multiple career grand tour triple crowns, both having won each race at least twice.

In bold the win that achieved a grand tour career triple crown.

 designates a World Championship winner.

Winning all three grand tours in one year
The definition of Triple Crown of Cycling can also mean winning all three Grand Tours in the same year. As of 2021, this has not been achieved. Only 39 times has a cyclist finished all three grand tours in one year, and of these 39 only Raphaël Géminiani (in 1955) and Gastone Nencini (in 1957) managed to finish in the top ten in each tour. In 2016, Alejandro Valverde was close to accomplishing the same feat – he finished 3rd in the Giro d'Italia, 6th in the Tour de France, and was in the top three after the first half of the Vuelta of Spain, but lost 11 minutes in the 14th stage before recovering to finish in 12th place in overall standings, less than 2 minutes behind 10th place.

In 2010, Alberto Contador's new team manager Bjarne Riis claimed that Contador could win all three grand tours in the same year, but his main rival Andy Schleck said it would be impossible.

"All the jerseys"
While no rider has ever won all three grand tours in a single calendar year, three riders have won the three Grand tours consecutively across two seasons, thus holding ''all the jerseys'' at one time.

Eddy Merckx won four consecutive grand tours in 1972–1973: Giro 1972, Tour 1972, Vuelta 1973, and Giro 1973. He is the only rider to have won four consecutive grand tours.

Bernard Hinault won three consecutive grand tours in 1982–1983: Giro 1982, Tour 1982, and Vuelta 1983. 

Chris Froome won three consecutive grand tours in 2017–2018: Tour 2017, Vuelta 2017 and Giro 2018 before finishing 3rd in Tour 2018. He was the first and to date only, rider to do so by beginning with the Tour de France.

Completing all three grand tours in one year

Cyclists who have completed all three grand tours in the same year
As of 2016, 39 riders completed all three grand tours in the same year:
6 times – Adam Hansen (AUS) – 2012, 2013, 2014, 2015, 2016, 2017
4 times – Marino Lejarreta (ESP) – 1987, 1989, 1990, 1991
3 times – Bernardo Ruiz (ESP) – 1955, 1956, 1957
2 times – Eduardo Chozas (ESP) – 1990, 1991
2 times – Carlos Sastre (ESP) – 2006, 2010

List of riders and results

Winning world titles in three disciplines
After Marianne Vos had won world titles in road race (2006), cyclo-cross (2006) and track points race (2008), she was said to have won the triple crown of cycling. In 2014, Pauline Ferrand-Prévot won the World Championship road race and followed this in 2015 with the world championships in cross-country mountain biking and cyclocross, which meant she held world titles in three cycling disciplines simultaneously.

Triple Crown of Track Cycling 
Sprint
Team sprint
Keirin

References

Road bicycle racing terminology
Grand Tour (cycling)